Gaza Strippers were an American garage punk band from Chicago formed by Rick Sims, who had previously played guitar with The Supersuckers and was the lead singer and lead guitarist of The Didjits. The band released its first single in 1997 on Bam Bam Records, titled "Transistor". The group released its first full-length album, Laced Candy, on Man's Ruin Records in 1999, and followed with 1000 Watt Confessions on Lookout! Records the following year in 2000. They released their next album, Electric Bible, on Twenty Stone Blatt Records in 2000. The group's final full-length album, From the Desk of Dr. Freepill, was issued in 2002. Both Rick Sims and Mike Hodgkiss share lead guitar.

Members
Rick Sims - vocals, guitar
Mike "Hadji" Hodgkiss - guitar
Darren Hooper - bass
Cory Stateler / Todd Marino / Mark Allen - drums

Discography
Laced Candy (Man's Ruin Records, 1999)
1000 Watt Confessions (Lookout! Records, 2000)
Electric Bible: The New Testament (Triple X Records, 2001)
From the Desk of Dr. Freepill (Nicotine Records, 2002)

References

Musical groups from Chicago
Punk rock groups from Illinois
Garage punk groups
Garage rock groups from Illinois